Witold Hatka (25 June 1939 – 13 November 2010) was a Polish politician who was a Member of the Sejm of the Republic of Poland twice (2001–05, 2005–07).

He was re-elected to the Sejm on 25 September 2005, getting 5856 votes in 4 Bydgoszcz district, as a candidate from the League of Polish Families list.

He was also a member of Sejm 2001-2005.

Hatka died in a car accident in Załachowo, Żnin County.

He was closely related to Stanisław Mikołajczyk, Polish Prime Minister in Exile (1943–44).

See also
Members of Polish Sejm 2005-2007

References

External links
Witold Hatka - parliamentary page - includes declarations of interest, voting record, and transcripts of speeches.

1939 births
2010 deaths
Politicians from Bydgoszcz
Members of the Polish Sejm 2001–2005
Members of the Polish Sejm 2005–2007
League of Polish Families politicians
Road incident deaths in Poland
Burials in Municipal Cemeteries in Bydgoszcz